4-Hydroxybenzaldehyde is one of the three isomers of hydroxybenzaldehyde. It can be found in the orchids Gastrodia elata, Galeola faberi, and the Vanilla orchids.

Chemistry 
The Dakin oxidation is an organic redox reaction in which an ortho- or para-hydroxylated phenyl aldehyde (2-hydroxybenzaldehyde or 4-hydroxybenzaldehyde) or ketone reacts with hydrogen peroxide in base to form a benzenediol and a carboxylate. Overall, the carbonyl group is oxidized, and the hydrogen peroxide is reduced.

Derivatives
Claisen-Schmidt condensation with acetone can have afforded raspberry ketone in an 80% overall yield.
Vanillin

Metabolism 
p-Hydroxybenzaldehyde dehydrogenase is an enzyme found in carrots (Daucus carota).

See also 
 Salicylaldehyde (2-hydroxybenzaldehyde)
 3-Hydroxybenzaldehyde

References 

Hydroxybenzaldehydes
Orchids
Vinylogous carboxylic acids